The following are the football (soccer) events of the year 1902 throughout the world.

Events
March 6: Real Madrid is founded

Clubs formed in 1902
Norwich City Football Club
Real Madrid
Fluminense Football Club
L.R. Vicenza
MSV Duisburg

Winners club national championship
Brazil - There was not a national championship. State, provincial as said in that time, championships were separately held for each province for five decades until 1959 Taça Brasil, a significant unifier cup among state champions. 1902 Campeonato Paulista, State of São Paulo championship, was pioneer in the country. 
São Paulo Province – São Paulo Athletic
Hungary:
Hungarian National Championship I – Budapesti T.C.
Italy:
Italian Football Championship – Genoa C.F.C.
Scotland:
Scottish Division One – Rangers
Scottish Division Two – Port Glasgow
Scottish Cup – Hibernian

International tournaments
1902 British Home Championship (February 22 – May 3, 1902)

Births
 May 1: Ernst Nagelschmitz, German footballer (died 1987)
 July 22 – Andrés Mazali, Uruguayan footballer
 November 20: Giampiero Combi (Italian footballer)

Deaths

References 

 
Association football by year